Frankewing is an unincorporated community in Giles County, Tennessee, United States. It is named for Frank Ewing who used his influence with state legislators to secure rail service to the area. A depot was built. It has a post office, with ZIP code is 38459. It is located 1 mile east of the interchange between Interstate 65 (I-65, exit 14) and U.S. Route 64 (US 64). There is a Bank of Frankewing. Bradshaw Creek flows through the area.

Demographics

Notes

Unincorporated communities in Giles County, Tennessee
Unincorporated communities in Tennessee